Qeynarjeh (also Romanized as Qeynarjeh and Qīnarjeh; also known as Gaynardzhe, Ghainarjeh, Qanbarcheh, and Qīnarcheh) is a village in Khararud Rural District, in the Central District of Khodabandeh County, Zanjan Province, Iran. At the 2006 census, its population was 597, in 121 families.

References 

Populated places in Khodabandeh County